František Smolík (23 January 1891 – 26 January 1972) was a Czechoslovak film actor. He appeared in more than 75 films between 1920 and 1968.

Selected filmography

The Mystery of the Blue Room (1933)
 The Ruined Shopkeeper (1933)
 Father Vojtech (1936)
 Lidé na kře (1937)
 Skeleton on Horseback (1937)
 Krok do tmy (1937)
 Škola základ života (1938)
 The Merry Wives (1938)
 Jiný vzduch (1939)
 Arthur and Leontine (1940)
 Ladies in Waiting (1940)
 Auntie's Fantasies (1941)
 Barbora Hlavsová (1942)
 The Respectable Ladies of Pardubice (1944)
 Spring Song (1944)
 The Wedding Ring (1944)
 The Adventurous Bachelor (1946)
 Capek's Tales (1947)
 Premonition (1947)
 Krakatit (1948)
 Lost in the Suburbs (1948)
 Jan Hus (1954)
 Dog's Heads (1955)
 Today for the Last Time (1958)
 Princezna se zlatou hvězdou (1959)
 Escape from the Shadows (1959)
 Higher Principle (1960)
 Ikarie XB-1 (1963)

References

External links
 

1891 births
1972 deaths
Czech male film actors
Czech male silent film actors
20th-century Czech male actors
Male actors from Prague
Czech male stage actors